The February 28 incident (also called the February 28 massacre, the 228 incident, or the 228 massacre) was an anti-government uprising in Taiwan that was violently suppressed by the Kuomintang–led nationalist government of the Republic of China (ROC). Directed by provincial governor Chen Yi and president Chiang Kai-shek, thousands of civilians were killed beginning on February 28, 1947. The incident is considered to be one of the most important events in Taiwan's modern history and was a critical impetus for the Taiwan independence movement.

In 1945, following the surrender of Japan at the end of World War II, the Allies handed administrative control of Taiwan over to China, thus ending 50 years of Japanese colonial rule. Local residents became resentful of what they saw as high-handed and frequently corrupt conduct on the part of the Kuomintang (KMT) authorities, including the arbitrary seizure of private property, economic mismanagement, and exclusion from political participation. The flashpoint came on February 27, 1947, in Taipei, when agents of the State Monopoly Bureau struck a Taiwanese widow suspected of selling contraband cigarettes. An officer then fired into a crowd of angry bystanders, striking one man, who died the next day. Soldiers fired upon demonstrators the next day, after which a radio station was seized by protesters and news of the revolt was broadcast to the entire island. As the uprising spread, the KMT–installed governor Chen Yi called for military reinforcements, and the uprising was violently put down by the National Revolutionary Army. Two years later, and for 38 years thereafter, the island would be placed under martial law in a period known as the "White Terror."

During the White Terror, the KMT persecuted perceived political dissidents, and the incident was considered too taboo to be discussed. President Lee Teng-hui became the first president to discuss the incident publicly on its anniversary in 1995. The event is now openly discussed, and its details have become the subject of government and academic investigation. February 28 is now an official public holiday called Peace Memorial Day, on which the president of Taiwan gathers with other officials to ring a commemorative bell in memory of the victims. Monuments and memorial parks to the victims of the February 28 incident have been erected in a number of Taiwanese cities. In particular, Taipei's former Taipei New Park was renamed 228 Peace Memorial Park, and the National 228 Memorial Museum was opened on February 28, 1997. The Kaohsiung Museum of History also has a permanent exhibit detailing the events of the incident in Kaohsiung. In 2019, the Transitional Justice Commission exonerated those who were convicted in the aftermath.

The number of deaths from the incident and massacre was estimated to be between 18,000 and 28,000. Other estimates are much lower. A government commission was set up under the administration of the pro-Taiwan independence president, Lee Teng-hui, to determine the facts. Using the civil registry set up during the Japanese administration, which was acknowledged by all as very efficient, they determined who was living at the time of the handover to the Chinese administration. The commission was given the power to award to the family of anyone who died in the period of the insurrection and the restoration of Nationalist government rule an amount of NT$6,000,000, about US$150,000. The families did not have to prove that the death was related to the above events. A total of 800 people came forward to get the awards for the people who died during the period.

Background

During the 50 years of Japanese rule in Taiwan (1895–1945), Taiwan experienced economic development and an increased standard of living, serving as a supply base for the Japanese main islands. After World War II, Taiwan was placed under the administrative control of the Republic of China to provide stability until a permanent arrangement could be made. Chen Yi, the governor-general of Taiwan, arrived on October 24, 1945, and received the last Japanese governor, Ando Rikichi, who signed the document of surrender on the next day. Chen Yi then proclaimed the day as Retrocession Day to make Taiwan part of the Republic of China.

Taiwanese perceptions of Japanese rule were more positive than perceptions in other parts of East and Southeast Asia that came under Japanese imperialism. Despite this, the Kuomintang troops from Mainland China were initially welcomed by the Taiwanese. Their harsh conduct and the corrupt KMT administration quickly led to Taiwanese discontent during the immediate postwar period. As governor-general, Chen Yi took over and sustained the Japanese system of state monopolies in tobacco, sugar, camphor, tea, paper, chemicals, petroleum refining, mining, and cement, the same way the Nationalists treated people in other former Japanese-controlled areas (earning Chen Yi the nickname "robber"). He confiscated some 500 Japanese-owned factories and mines, as well as the homes of former Japanese residents. Economic mismanagement led to a large black market, runaway inflation, and food shortages. Many commodities were compulsorily bought cheaply by the KMT administration and shipped to Mainland China to meet the Civil War shortages, where they were sold at a very high profit, furthering the general shortage of goods in Taiwan. The price of rice rose to 100 times its original value between the time the Nationalists took over and the spring of 1946, increasing to nearly four times the price in Shanghai. It inflated further to 400 times the original price by January 1947. Carpetbaggers from Mainland China dominated nearly all industry, as well as political and judicial offices, displacing the Taiwanese who were formerly employed. Many of the ROC garrison troops were highly undisciplined, looting, stealing, and contributing to the overall breakdown of infrastructure and public services. Because the Taiwanese elites had met with some success with self-government under Japanese rule, they had expected the same system from the incoming ruling Chinese Nationalist Government. However, the Chinese Nationalists opted for a different route, aiming for the centralization of government powers and a reduction in local authority. The KMT's nation-building efforts followed this ideology because of unpleasant experiences with the diverging forces during the Warlord Era in 1916–1928 that had torn the government in China. Mainland Communists were even preparing to bring down the government like the Ili Rebellion. The different goals of the Nationalists and the Taiwanese, coupled with cultural and language misunderstandings, served to further inflame tensions on both sides.

Uprising and crackdown

When she demanded their return, one of the men struck her in the head with the butt of his gun, prompting the surrounding Taiwanese crowd to challenge the Tobacco Monopoly agents. As they fled, one agent shot his gun into the crowd, hitting a bystander who died the next day. The crowd, which had already been harbouring feelings of frustration from unemployment, inflation, and corruption towards the Nationalist government, reached its breaking point. The crowd protested to both the police and the gendarmes but was mostly ignored.

Protesters gathered the next morning around Taipei, calling for the arrest and trial of the agents involved in the previous day's shooting, and eventually made their way to the Governor General's Office, where security forces tried to disperse the crowd. Soldiers opened fire into the crowd, killing at least three people. On March 4, the Taiwanese took over the administration of the town and military bases and forced their way into a local radio station to broadcast news of the incident and call for people to revolt, causing uprisings to erupt throughout the island. By evening, martial law had been declared, and curfews were enforced by the arrest or shooting of anyone who violated the curfew.

For several weeks after the February 28 incident, Taiwanese civilians controlled much of Taiwan. The initial riots were spontaneous and sometimes violent, with mainland Chinese receiving beatings from and being killed by Taiwanese. Over 1,000 mainlanders were killed. Within a few days, the Taiwanese were generally coordinated and organized, and public order in Taiwanese-held areas was upheld by volunteer civilians organised by students and unemployed former Japanese army soldiers. Local leaders formed settlement committees (or resolution committees), which presented the government with a list of 32 demands for reform of the provincial administration. They demanded, among other things, greater autonomy, free elections, the surrender of the ROC Army to the Settlement Committee, and an end to government corruption. Motivations among the various Taiwanese groups varied; some demanded greater autonomy within the ROC, while others wanted UN trusteeship or full independence. The Taiwanese also demanded representation in the forthcoming peace treaty negotiations with Japan, hoping to secure a plebiscite to determine the island's political future.

Outside of Taipei, there were examples of the formation of local militias, such as the Communist-inspired 27 Brigade near Taichung. In Chiayi, the mayor's residence was set on fire, and local militias fought with the military police.

The Nationalist Government, under governor Chen Yi, stalled for time while it waited for reinforcements from Fujian. Upon their arrival on March 8, the ROC troops launched a crackdown. The New York Times reported, "An American who had just arrived in China from Taihoku said that troops from the mainland China arrived there on March 7 and indulged in three days of indiscriminate killing and arrest. For a time, everyone seen on the streets was fired upon, homes were broken into, and occupants were arrested. In the lower income sections the streets were said to have been littered with dead.

By the end of March, Chen Yi had ordered the imprisonment or execution of the leading Taiwanese organizers he could identify. His troops reportedly executed, according to a Taiwanese delegation in Nanjing, maybe between 3,000 to 4,000 people throughout the island, though the exact number is still undetermined. Detailed records kept by the KMT have been reported as missing. Some of the killings were random, while others were systematic. Taiwanese political leaders were among those targeted, and many of the Taiwanese who had formed self-governing groups during the reign of the Japanese were also victims of the February 28 incident. A disproportionate number of the victims had been discharged from the Imperial Japanese Army and came back unemployed. They were involved in the riots and looting and beat up recent immigrants from China. They presented the most fear, as they looked no different from Japanese soldiers from the mainland.

Some political organisations that participated in the uprising, for example the Taiwan Democratic Self-Government League, were declared "communist." Many of their members were arrested and executed.

By late March 1947, the central executive committee of the KMT had recommended that Chen Yi be dismissed as governor-general over the "merciless brutality" he had shown in suppressing the rebellion. In June 1948, he was appointed provincial chairman of Zhejiang province. In January 1949, he attempted to defect to the Chinese Communist Party, but Chiang Kai-shek immediately relieved Chen of his duties. Chen Yi was escorted to Taiwan and later imprisoned in Keelung. In May 1950, a Taiwan military court sentenced Chen Yi to death for espionage. On June 18, he was executed at Machangding, Taipei.

Legacy

During the February 28 incident, Taiwanese leaders established Resolution Committees in various cities (with a central committee in Taipei) and demanded greater political autonomy. Negotiations with the ROC ended when troops arrived in early March. The subsequent feelings of betrayal felt towards the government and China are widely believed to have catalysed today's Taiwan independence movement post-democratization. The initial February 28 purge was followed two years later by 38 years of martial law, commonly referred to as the White Terror, which lasted until the end of 1987, during which over 100,000 people were imprisoned for political reasons of which over 1,000 were executed. During this time, discussion of the incident was taboo.

In the 1970s, the 228 Justice and Peace Movement was initiated by several citizen groups to ask for a reversal of this policy and in 1992, the Executive Yuan promulgated the "February 28 Incident Research Report."  Then-president and KMT chairman Lee Teng-hui, who had participated in the incident and was arrested as an instigator and a Communist sympathizer, made a formal apology on behalf of the government in 1995 and declared February 28 a day to commemorate the victims. Among other memorials erected, Taipei New Park was renamed 228 Memorial Park.

In 1990, the ROC Executive Yuan set up a task force to investigate the February 28 incident. The "Report of the 228 Incident" (二二八事件研究報告) was published in 1992, and a memorial was set up in 1995 at the 228 Peace Park in Taipei. In October 1995, the state-funded Memorial Foundation of 228 (二二八事件紀念基金會) was established to distribute compensation again and award rehabilitation certificates to victims of the February 28 incident in order to restore their reputation. Family members of dead and missing victims are eligible for NT$6 million (approximately US$190,077). The foundation reviewed 2,885 applications, most of which were accepted. Of these, 686 involved deaths, 181 involved missing persons, and 1,459 involved imprisonment. Many descendants of victims remain unaware that their family members were victims, while many of the families of victims from Mainland China did not know the details of their relatives' mistreatment during the riot. Those who have received compensation twice are still demanding trials of the still-living soldiers and officials who were responsible for the jail terms and deaths of their loved ones. On the other hand, some survivors thought the arrest and questioning had more to do with looting and riot participation as many unemployed citizens had just been discharged from the Japanese Imperial Army from overseas.

On February 28, 2004, thousands of Taiwanese participated in the 228 Hand-in-Hand Rally.

In 2006, the Research Report on Responsibility for the 228 Massacre (二二八事件責任歸屬研究報告) was released after several years of research. The 2006 report was not intended to overlap with the prior (1992) 228 Massacre Research Report commissioned by the Executive Yuan. Chiang Kai-shek is specifically named as having the largest responsibility in the 2006 report.

Art
A number of artists in Taiwan have addressed the subject of the February 28 incident since the taboo was lifted on the subject in the early 1990s. The incident has been the subject of music by Fan-Long Ko and Tyzen Hsiao and a number of literary works.

Film
Hou Hsiao-hsien's A City of Sadness, the first movie that addressed the events, won the Golden Lion at the 1989 Venice Film Festival. The 2009 thriller Formosa Betrayed also relates the incident as part of the motivation behind Taiwan independence activist characters.

Literature
Jennifer Chow's 2013 novel The 228 Legacy revealed the emotional ramifications for those who lived through the events yet suppressed their knowledge out of fear. It focused on how there was such an impact that it permeated throughout multiple generations within the same family. Shawna Yang Ryan's 2016 novel Green Island tells the story of the incident as it affects three generations of a Taiwanese family, while Julie Wu's novel The Third Son (2013) describes the event and its aftermath from the viewpoint of a Taiwanese boy.

Music
The Taiwanese metal band Chthonic's album Mirror of Retribution makes several lyrical references to the February 28 incident.

See also

 Formosa Betrayed (1965 book)
 History of Taiwan
 History of the Republic of China
 List of massacres in Taiwan
 List of massacres in China
 The First 228 Peace Memorial Monument
 228 Hand-in-Hand Rally (in 2004)
 Political status of Taiwan
 White Terror (Taiwan)
 Universal Declaration of Human Rights (1948)
KMT retreat to Taiwan in 1949
 1989 Tiananmen Square protests and massacre
 2019–2020 Hong Kong protests

Notes

References

Bibliography

. Reprinted in:

External links

 
 
 
 
 
 
 
 
 
 
 The 228 Incident and Taiwan's Transitional Justice – The Diplomat
 Japanese 228 victim's son awarded compensation – Taipei Times
 Tsai vows to investigate 228 Incident – Taipei Times
 Family of Korean killed in Taiwan's '228 Incident' in 1947 to get compensation – The Japan Times
 KMT slows transitional justice: Koo – Taipei Times
 Forum underlines importance of 228 education – Taipei Times
 Chiang Kai-shek removal backed – Taipei Times
 228 evidence indicts Chiang: academic – Taipei Times
 Document unearthed shows double-dealing of Chiang behind 228 Incident – Taiwan News

 
1947 in Taiwan
1947 protests
Conflicts in 1947
Kuomintang
Cold War rebellions
February 1947 events in Asia
Mass murder in 1947
Protests in Taiwan
Protest-related deaths
Rebellions in Asia
Taiwanese democracy movements
Taiwan independence movement
White Terror (Taiwan)
1940s in Taiwan
20th-century rebellions